Pyrgulina maiae is a species of sea snail, a marine gastropod mollusk in the family Pyramidellidae, the pyrams and their allies.

Distribution
This marine species occurs in the following locations:
 European waters (ERMS scope)
 Mediterranean Sea
 Mersin Bay

References

 Hornung A. & Mermod G. (1924). Mollusques de la Mer Rouge recueillis par A. Issel faisant partie des collections du Musée Civique d'Histoire Naturelle de Gênes. Première partie, Pyramidellides. Annali del Museo Civico di Storia Naturale Giacomo Doria, Genova, 51: 283-311

External links
 To Biodiversity Heritage Library (2 publications)
 To CLEMAM
 To Encyclopedia of Life
 To World Register of Marine Species

Pyramidellidae
Gastropods described in 1924